Albert Philpott (14 March 1873 – 25 November 1950) was an Australian cricketer. He played one first-class cricket match for Victoria in 1894.

See also
 List of Victoria first-class cricketers

References

External links
 

1873 births
1950 deaths
Australian cricketers
Victoria cricketers
Cricketers from Melbourne